Three Years to Play is a 1970 British novel by Colin MacInnes. It was first published in the United Kingdom by MacGibbon & Kee, and in the United States by Farrar, Straus and Giroux.

References 

1970 British novels
British historical novels
Fiction set in the 1590s
Fiction set in the 1600s
Novels set in Tudor England
Novels set in London
Works about organised crime in the United Kingdom
Novels by Colin MacInnes
MacGibbon & Kee books